Beckmannia eruciformis, the European slough-grass or slough grass, is an annual or short lived perennial in the grass family, Poaceae, found in shallow marshes or sloughs, and used for animal fodder and forage.

Distribution
This species is native in Western Asia, Turkey through Siberia, Kazakhstan, Southeastern Europe, Eastern Europe, and Central Europe.

It is one of only two species in the genus Beckmannia; the other being Beckmannia syzigachne.

References

 Czerepanov, S. K. 1995. Vascular plants of Russia and adjacent states (the former USSR).
 Davis, P. H., ed. 1965–1988. Flora of Turkey and the east Aegean islands.
 Encke, F. et al. 1984. Zander: Handwörterbuch der Pflanzennamen, 13. Auflage.
 Food and Agriculture Organization of the UN (FAO). 2010. Ecocrop (on-line resource).
 Rehm, S. 1994. Multilingual dictionary of agronomic plants.
 Stace, Clive 1995. New Flora of the British Isles.
 Tutin, T. G. et al., eds. 1964–1980. Flora europaea.
 Tzvelev, N. N. 1976. Zlaki SSSR.

Pooideae
Bunchgrasses of Europe
Bunchgrasses of Asia
Flora of Western Asia
Plants described in 1753
Taxa named by Carl Linnaeus